Bunitrolol is a beta-adrenergic antagonist.

References

Beta blockers
2-Hydroxybenzonitrile ethers
N-tert-butyl-phenoxypropanolamines